Events from the year 1728 in Denmark.

Incumbents
 Monarch – Frederick IV
 Grand Chancellor – Ulrik Adolf Holstein

Events

 14 July – Vitus Bering begins his first exploration aboard the ship Gabriel and sailed northward from the Kamchatka Peninsula and through the strait that now bears his name.
 20 October – The Copenhagen Fire of 1728 breaks out.
 23 October – The fire in Copenhagen finally dies out after destroying approximately 28% of the city and leaving 20% of its population homeless.

Undated
 The Lille Grønnegade Theatre in Copenhagen, the first public theater in Denmark, is closed. 
 A new town hall is built in Viborg next to Viborg Cathedral. The building now houses the Skovgaard Museum

Births
 26 June – Frederik Christian von Haven, philologist, theologian and patron of the arts (died 1763)
 29 July  Hermann Abbestée, governor of Danish India (died 1794)
 18 October – Peter Frederik Suhm, historian (died 1798

Deaths
 24 September – Frederik Krag, noble, civil servant (born 1655)

References

 
1720s in Denmark
Denmark
Years of the 18th century in Denmark